The Ecuadorian piedtail (Phlogophilus hemileucurus) is a species of hummingbird in the "coquettes", tribe Lesbiini of subfamily Lesbiinae. It is found in Colombia, Ecuador, and Peru.

Taxonomy and systematics

The Ecuadorian piedtail shares its genus with the Peruvian piedtail (P. harterti). It is monotypic.

Description

The adult male and female are alike. They have a short, straight, black bill with a yellowish base. Their crown is greenish brown and the rest of the upperparts grass green. They have a white spot behind the eye. The throat and breast are white with green spots with a white band separating them. The belly is whitish. The innermost pair of tail feathers are blue-green; the others are blue with white bases and broad white tips. Juveniles resemble the adults but their head and neck feathers have buff fringes.

Distribution and habitat

The Ecuadorian piedtail is found in the eastern foothills of the Andes from Colombia's Putumayo and Cauca departments south through eastern Ecuador into northeastern Peru's departments of San Martín and Loreto.

Behavior

Movement

The Ecuadorian piedtail is mostly sedentary but local altitudinal movements are believed to be likely.

Feeding

It perches to take nectar from flowers and to glean small insects from foliage.

Breeding

The Ecuadorian piedtail's breeding season spans from December to April. It is sited in vines or under overhanging thickets. The clutch size is two eggs.

Vocalization

The Ecuadorian piedtail's song is "a series of typically three high-pitched buzzy notes...followed by several twittering notes 'tzeeeee...tzeee.tzew..tititititi', continuously repeated." Its calls include "a descending series of 3–4 high-pitched 'see' notes..., a repeated 'tsik' note and high-pitched twittering."

Status

The IUCN  assesses the Ecuadorian piedtail as least concern. "Much of its habitat is under intense pressure from agriculture and cattle pasture, low-intensity farming, tea and coffee growing, mining operations and logging."

References

Ecuadorian piedtail
Birds of the Ecuadorian Andes
Ecuadorian piedtail
Taxonomy articles created by Polbot